Edward J. Cashin (1927– September 8, 2007) was an American historian. He was Professor emeritus of History and Director of the Center for the Study of Georgia History at Augusta State University in Augusta, Georgia. Cashin was the author of many books and numerous articles on the history of Georgia, especially Augusta, and the Southern frontier in the 18th century.

He was a native son of Augusta, Georgia, where he graduated from Boys Catholic High School in 1945. He was a graduate of Marist College in Poughkeepsie, NY., in 1952. He received his M.A. from Fordham University in New York. He received his Ph.D. in American History from Fordham in 1962. His doctoral dissertation was entitled “Thomas E. Watson and the Catholic Laymen's Association of Georgia.” He was appointed Academic Vice-President of Marist College in 1963, while continuing teaching in the History Department there.

Dr. Cashin returned to his hometown as associate history professor at Augusta College (now Augusta University) in 1969. He was named a full professor in 1972. He became chairman of the department of history in 1975. He retired from Augusta State University in 1996 as professor emeritus. He then founded and became director of the Center for the Study of Georgia History at Augusta State University.

Besides his popularity as a classroom professor, Dr. Cashin was well known for his extensive research, knowledge and historical writings. Through his biographies of people such as Scottish trader Lachlan McGillivray, "King's Ranger" Thomas Brown, and numerous other important figures, Dr. Cashin provided narratives which preserved knowledge of the central roles they had in Georgia's history.

Dr. Cashin was not just a talented historian who loved Georgia history.  He was highly respected by students, colleagues and friends. He epitomized the expression "a gentleman and a scholar." Through his leadership and involvement in many historical activities and organizations, he was a major figure in preserving the region's history.

Cashin died on Saturday, September 8, 2007, in a hospital in  Atlanta, Georgia. He had collapsed two days earlier while researching his next book.

Works 
 1975 Augusta and the American Revolution: Events in the Georgia Back Country 1773-1783 (with Heard Robertson)
 1976 A History of Augusta College (with Helen Callahan)
 1978 An Informal History of Augusta
 1980 The Story of Augusta
 1985 The Quest: A History Of Public Education In Richmond County, Georgia
 1986 Colonial Augusta: "Key of the Indian Countrey" (editor)
 1987 The Story of Sacred Heart
 1989 The King's Ranger: Thomas Brown and the American Revolution on the Southern Frontier
 1992 Lachlan McGillivray, Indian Trader: The Shaping of the Southern Colonial Frontier
 1994 Governor Henry Ellis and the Transformation of British North America
 1994 A Wilderness Still the Cradle of Nature: Frontier Georgia
 1995 Old Springfield: Race and Religion in Augusta, Georgia
 1995 Setting Out to Begin a New World: Colonial Georgia, A Documentary History
 2000 William Bartram and the American Revolution on the Southern Frontier
 2001 General Sherman's Girl Friend and Other Stories About Augusta (illustrated by Jeb Cashin)
 2001 Paternalism in a Southern City: Race, Religion, and Gender in Augusta, Georgia (editor, with Glenn T. Eskew)
 2001 Beloved Bethesda: A History of George Whitefield's Home for Boys
 2003 From Balloons to Blue Angels: The story of Aviation in Augusta, Georgia
 2009 Guardians of the Valley: Chickasaws in Colonial South Carolina and Georgia (posthumous publication)

Awards 
 Governor's Award from the Georgia Humanities Council
 1997 Hugh McCall Award from the Georgia Association of Historians
 1992 Malcolm and Muriel Barrow Bell Award of the Georgia Historical Society, for Lachlan McGillivray
 1990 Fraunces Tavern Book Award of the American Revolution Round Table, for The King's Ranger

External links 
 Biographical entry in the New Georgia Encyclopedia
 Augusta State University, Emeritus Faculty

20th-century American historians
20th-century American male writers
Writers from Augusta, Georgia
1927 births
2007 deaths
Place of birth missing
Marist College alumni
Fordham University alumni
Georgia Regents University faculty
American male non-fiction writers
Historians from Georgia (U.S. state)